Zynaps is a side-scrolling shoot 'em up video game published by Hewson Consultants for the ZX Spectrum, Amstrad CPC and Commodore 64 in 1987 and for the Atari ST in 1988 and the Amiga.

It was authored by Dominic Robinson, John Cumming and Stephen Crow, with music by Steve Turner.  The graphics for the Atari ST and Amiga versions were by Pete Lyon.

Dominic Robinson and Steve Turner had previously worked together on the ZX Spectrum version of Uridium.

Critical reaction
The ZX Spectrum version of Zynaps was reviewed in the August 1987 issue of Your Sinclair, receiving 9/10 and being described as "smooth and slick". CRASH magazine awarded it a CRASH Smash in issue 42. The game also won the award for best shooting game of the year according to the readers of Crash.

References

External links

Play Zynaps at Gumplayer

1987 video games
Amiga games
Amstrad CPC games
Atari ST games
Commodore 64 games
Hewson Consultants games
Multiplayer and single-player video games
Multiplayer hotseat games
Shoot 'em ups
Video games developed in the United Kingdom
ZX Spectrum games